The 2019–20 season was Sydney FC's 15th season since its establishment in 2004. The club competed in the A-League for the 15th time and the FFA Cup for the sixth time.

On 24 March 2020, the FFA announced that the 2019–20 A-League season would be postponed until further notice due to the COVID-19 pandemic in Australia and New Zealand, and subsequently extended indefinitely. The season resumed on 17 July 2020. Similarly, the 2020 AFC Champions League competition has been suspended until at least mid-September 2020 in West Zone. The AFC Executive Committee agreed to played AFC Champions League East Zone matches which are now scheduled to be played between November 15 and December 13 2020 in Qatar.

Players

Squad information

Transfers

Transfers in

From youth squad

Transfers out

Contract extensions

Squad statistics

Appearances and goals

{| class="wikitable sortable plainrowheaders" style="text-align:center"
|-
! rowspan="2" |
! rowspan="2" |
! rowspan="2" style="width:180px;" |Player
! colspan="2" style="width:87px;" |A-League
! colspan="2" style="width:87px;" |FFA Cup
! colspan="2" style="width:87px;" |Total
|-
!
!Goals
!
!Goals
!
!Goals
|-
|1
|GK
! scope="row" | Andrew Redmayne

|8
|0

|1
|0

!9
!0
|-
|2
|DF
! scope="row" | Patrick Flottmann

|0
|0

|0
|0

!0
!0
|-
|3
|DF
! scope="row" | Ben Warland

|0
|0

|0
|0

!0
!0
|-
|4
|DF
! scope="row" | Alex Wilkinson

|9
|0

|1
|0

!10
!0
|-
|5
|MF
! scope="row" | Alexander Baumjohann

|9
|0

|1
|0

!10
!0
|-
|6
|DF
! scope="row" | Ryan McGowan

|9
|1

|1
|0

!10
!1
|-
|7
|DF
! scope="row" | Michael Zullo

|2+1
|0

|0+1
|0

!4
!0
|-
|8
|MF
! scope="row" | Paulo Retre

|7+2
|0

|0+1
|0

!10
!0
|-
|9
|FW
! scope="row" | Adam Le Fondre

|9
|10

|1
|0

!10
!10
|-
|10
|MF
! scope="row" | Miloš Ninković

|8
|3

|1
|0

!9
!3
|-
|11
|FW
! scope="row" | Kosta Barbarouses

|9
|4

|1
|0

!10
!4
|-
|12
|FW
! scope="row" | Trent Buhagiar

|0+5
|1

|0
|0

!5
!1
|-
|13
|MF
! scope="row" | Brandon O'Neill

|7
|1

|1
|0

!8
!1
|-
|16
|DF
! scope="row" | Joel King

|3+4
|0

|1
|0

!8
!0
|-
|17
|MF
! scope="row" | Anthony Cáceres

|1+8
|0

|1
|0

!10
!0
|-
|18
|FW
! scope="row" | Luke Ivanovic

|0+4
|0

|0
|0

!4
!0
|-
|20
|GK
! scope="row" | Tom Heward-Belle

|1
|0

|0
|0

!1
!0
|-
|21
|DF
! scope="row" | Harry Van Der Saag

|0+1
|0

|0
|0

!1 
!0
|-
|23
|DF
! scope="row" | Rhyan Grant

|8
|1

|1
|0

!9
!1
|-
|24
|FW
! scope="row" | Marco Tilio

|0
|0

|0
|0

!0
!0
|-
|25
|MF
! scope="row" | Ryan Teague

|0+1
|0

|0
|0

!1
!0
|-
|26
|MF
! scope="row" | Luke Brattan

|9
|0

|0+1
|0

!10
!0
|-
|27
|FW
! scope="row" | Jordi Swibel

|2
|0

|0
|0

!2
!0
|-
|40
|GK
! scope="row" | Tristan Prendergast

|0
|0

|0
|0

!0
!0
|}

Disciplinary record

Clean sheets

Preseason

Friendlies

Competitions

Overview

{|class="wikitable" style="text-align:left"
|-
!rowspan=2 style="width:140px;"|Competition
!colspan=8|Record
|-
!style="width:40px;"|
!style="width:40px;"|
!style="width:40px;"|
!style="width:40px;"|
!style="width:40px;"|
!style="width:40px;"|
!style="width:40px;"|
!style="width:70px;"|
|-
|A-League

|-
|FFA Cup

|-
|AFC Champions League

|-
!Total

FFA Cup

A-League

League table

Results summary

Result by round

Matches

Finals series

AFC Champions League

Group stage

Statistics

Squad statistics 

† Player left Sydney during the season

Goals 

 As of 4 December 2020

Clean sheets 

 As of 4 December 2020

End-of-season awards
On 4 September 2020, Sydney FC announced all their award winners for the 2019/20 season.

References

Sydney FC seasons
2019–20 A-League season by team